Mariyana Dimitrova (born 29 July 1982) is a Bulgarian sprint athlete who specializes in the women's 400 metres.

She finished sixth in the 400 m final at the 2006 IAAF World Indoor Championships in Moscow, and fourth at the 2006 European Athletics Championships in Gothenburg, the latter in a personal best time of 50.64 seconds. She also competed in the same event at the 2004 Olympics, reaching the semi-finals.

External links
 

1982 births
Living people
Bulgarian female sprinters
Athletes (track and field) at the 2004 Summer Olympics
Olympic athletes of Bulgaria
Olympic female sprinters
20th-century Bulgarian women
21st-century Bulgarian women